Benefit Cosmetics LLC is a manufacturer of cosmetics founded and headquartered in San Francisco, California. It is a subsidiary of LVMH Moët Hennessy Louis Vuitton.

History

Benefit was founded by twin sisters Jean and Jane Ford. Born in Indiana, they attended Indiana University before moving to San Francisco. In 1976, the twins opened a beauty boutique named The Face Place in San Francisco's Mission District. The Face Place later moved to Kearny Street in downtown San Francisco in the 1980s.

In 1989, the Face Place product catalog was developed. The Fords then focused on department store distribution and renamed the company Benefit Cosmetics in 1990. In 1991, Benefit opened its first U.S. department store in Henri Bendel, located in New York City. In 1997, Benefit went international with its expansion into Harrods in London. Soon after, the Benefit Cosmetics product website was launched.

LVMH acquired Benefit Cosmetics on September 14, 1999. In 2001, Benefit launched its first bath and boudoir line, Bathina. Benefit opened its first "Brow Bar" (a boutique specializing in brow shaping) in 2003, at Macy's Union Square, San Francisco.

Notable events
On April 21, 2012, Benefit Cosmetics won a Guinness World Record for accomplishing the most eyebrow waxes performed in 8 hours by a team, completing 382 eyebrow waxes.

In 2022, Marks and Spencer announced their partnership with Benefit Cosmetics which would feature more than 200 products. Benefit Cosmetics products would be available online at M&S.com and in-store at 5 locations in Camberley, Cheshire Oaks, Handforth Dean, Hedge End, and Lisburn.

Benefit Hoola Matte Bronzer 
Benefit Cosmetic's "Hoola Matte Bronzer" was recognized as the "best beauty product" by Nylon in 2014. It was included on the list of Top 10 Best Bronzers of 2018 and named the most-sold bronzer in England by Vogue. The "Hoola Matte Bronzer" was the best-selling bronzer in the United States.

References

External links
 Official Website

Cosmetics companies of the United States
Manufacturing companies based in San Francisco
Chemical companies established in 1976
1976 establishments in California
Cosmetics brands
LVMH brands